David Scannell may refer to:
 David John Scannell (1875–1923), US marine who was awarded the Medal of Honor
 David S. Scannell (1820–1893), San Francisco's first professional Fire Chief 
 David Scannell (fireboat), a fireboat operated by San Francisco from 1909 to 1954

Scannell, David